Matayaya is a town in the San Juan province of the Dominican Republic.

Sources 
 – World-Gazetteer.com

Populated places in San Juan Province (Dominican Republic)